Bauladu, meaning "wide ford", is a comune (municipality) in the Province of Oristano in the Italian region Sardinia, located about  northwest of Cagliari and about  northeast of Oristano.

Bauladu borders the following municipalities: Bonarcado, Milis, Paulilatino, Solarussa, Tramatza.

Demographic evolution

References

Cities and towns in Sardinia